Ecsenius sellifer, known commonly as the saddle blenny in Guam, or the saddle clown blenny in Micronesia, is a species of combtooth blenny in the genus Ecsenius. It is found in coral reefs in the western Pacific ocean. It can reach a maximum length of 4.1 centimetres. Blennies in this species feed primarily off of plants, including benthic algae and weeds.

References
 Springer, V. G. 1988 (14 Sept.) The Indo-Pacific blenniid fish genus Ecsenius. Smithsonian Contributions to Zoology No. 465: i-iv + 1–134, col. Pls. 1-14.

sellifer
Fish described in 1988
Taxa named by Victor G. Springer